Pedro Canaveri (1891-?) was an Argentine politician and sports manager. He was member of the board of directors and president of the Club Atlético Independiente. In 1946, Canaveri was elected to the post of president of the Argentine Football Association.

Biography 

Canaveri was born in Ramallo, Buenos Aires, son of Pedro Canaveris and María Telechea, belonging to a family of French Basque roots. His father a Creole of Irish descent, belonged to a family of tanners from the southern area of Barracas. 

In 1919, Pedro Canaveri began his career as president of the Club Atlético Independiente, where he was responsible for construction of the first concrete stadium in South America. He was the president of the institution of Avellaneda in the years 1919, 1922-1933 and 1942-1945. In 1931, he carried out a project to divide the thirty four teams of First division into three sections, A. B. C.

In 1946 Pedro Canaveri was appointed president of the Argentine Football Association, succeeding Eduardo Ávalos. He only remained in office until 1947. After of the Revolución Libertadora, Canaveri was appointed as a member of the Controller Commission of AFA, presided at that time by Arturo A. Bullrich.

Pedro Canaveri was married on June 26, 1920 with Mercedes Leira, daughter of José Leira and Mercedes Salgado, belonging to a Spanish family originally from A Coruña. He was cousin of Zoilo Canaveri, a famous Argentine Uruguayan soccer player, who played in Racing Club de Avellaneda and Club Atlético Independiente.

References

External links 
afa.org.ar
familysearch.org
familysearch.org          
familysearch.org 
familysearch.org
familysearch.org

1891 births
People from Buenos Aires
People from Avellaneda
Argentine football chairmen and investors
Radical Civic Union politicians
Argentine people of Italian descent
Argentine people of Basque descent
Argentine people of French descent
Argentine people of Irish descent
Argentine people of Ligurian descent
People of Piedmontese descent
Argentine people of Catalan descent
Sportspeople from Avellaneda
Year of death missing
Presidents of the Argentine Football Association